Albert Schulz (1802–1893) was a German writer on mediaeval literature, especially the Arthurian legends.

Biography
Schulz was born at Schwedt, studied law, and entered the judicial service at Magdeburg.

Works
Schulz's studies in his specialized field were published under the pseudonym San Marte:
 Leben und Dichten Wolframs von Eschenbach (1836–1841) – includes a version of the Parzival
 Die Arthursage (1842)
 Nennius und Gildas (1844)
 Beiträge zur bretonischen und keltisch-germanischen Heldensage (1847)
 Rückblicke auf Dichtungen und Sagen des deutschen Mittelalters (1872)

Notes

References

Further reading
 

1802 births
1893 deaths
People from Schwedt
People from the Margraviate of Brandenburg
German male writers
Writers from Brandenburg